The Welsh Socialist Republican Movement (Mudiad Sosialaidd Gweriniaethol Cymru) was a short-lived nationalist political movement which was born out of frustration with Plaid Cymru's failure to oppose the first referendum on Welsh Devolution in 1979 in order to map out a specific policy of arguing for Independence. It was also an attempt to develop a Welsh Socialist alternative to Plaid Cymru and it produced pamphlets and a newspaper called Y Faner Goch (The Red Flag).

The WSRM was socialist and republican but there was a fundamental contradiction between those positions which was never resolved and was the basic reason it fell apart the moment that the police, following undercover operations targeting student circles in Aberystwyth and Bangor in the early 1980s, arrested and prosecuted WSRM members for conspiracy to cause explosions.

After its collapse around half a dozen members joined the Communist Party of Great Britain, some returned to Plaid Cymru, and others became active in issue-orientated movements.

The socialist remnants published a couple more copies of Y Faner Goch ("The Red Flag") and then reformed in the late 1980s to create Cymru Goch (Red Wales), a small socialist political party that lasted another 20 years, publishing Y Faner Goch until 2003 and establishing The Red Poets' Society, an annual poetry magazine that is active today.

References

Further reading 

Defunct political parties in Wales
Left-wing nationalist parties
Political parties established in 1979
Socialist parties in Wales
Republican parties in the United Kingdom
Republicanism in Wales
Welsh nationalist parties